Xantharia is a genus of spiders in the family Miturgidae. It was first described in 2001 by Deeleman-Reinhold. , it contains 3 Asian species.

References

Miturgidae
Araneomorphae genera
Spiders of Asia